Fareed Sadat (Dari:فرید سادات; born 10 November 1998) is an Afghan professional footballer who plays as a forward for Thai League 2 club Nakhon Si United and the Afghanistan national team.

Born in Afghanistan, Sadat represented Finland at youth international level before switching to represent the Afghanistan at senior level.

Early and personal life
Born in Kabul, Afghanistan, Sadat arrived in Finland in 2011, to join his father who had moved there previously. In October 2016 he stated that he was intending to apply for Finnish citizenship when he turned 18. He has acquired Finnish citizenship.

Club career
Sadat played youth football for Espoo, Atlantis, and GrIFK.

Sadat has played senior football for GrIFK, Espoo, Lahti, Lahti Akatemia, Haukar, MuSa, AC Oulu and OLS.

In October 2016, Sadat signed a new two-year contract with FC Lahti. In August 2021, he joined the Finnish second-tier side MuSa.

He signed for Cambodian club Phnom Penh Crown for the 2022 season. He scored twice on his debut against Visakha in a 2-1 win, helping his team lift the first ever Cambodia Super Cup. In the 2022 season he scored 19 goals in 25 league games.

He signed for Thai club Nakhon Si United for the 2023 season.

International career
Sadat has represented Finland at under-19 international level. Sadat made his debut with the Afghanistan national football team in a 2–0 friendly loss to Turkmenistan on 25 December 2019.

References

External links
Playing stats at Finnish FA

1998 births
Living people
Footballers from Kabul
Afghan footballers
Afghanistan international footballers
Finnish footballers
Finland youth international footballers
Finnish people of Afghan descent
Afghan emigrants to Finland
FC Espoo players
Grankulla IFK players
FC Lahti players
FC Kuusysi players
Pallokerho Keski-Uusimaa players
AC Oulu players
Kakkonen players
Veikkausliiga players
Association football forwards
Haukar men's football players
Naturalized citizens of Finland
Musan Salama players
Oulun Luistinseura players
Phnom Penh Crown FC players
Finnish expatriate footballers
Afghan expatriate footballers
Finnish expatriate sportspeople in Iceland
Afghan expatriates in Iceland
Expatriate footballers in Iceland
Finnish expatriate sportspeople in Cambodia
Afghan expatriates in Cambodia
Expatriate footballers in Cambodia
Fareed Sadat
Nakhon Si United F.C. players
Expatriate footballers in Thailand